Gjio Bain (born July 15, 1985) is a Bahamian professional basketball player for San-en NeoPhoenix in Japan.

References

External links
Stats in Japan

1985 births
Living people
Bahamian men's basketball players
Bahamian expatriates in Japan
Centers (basketball)
Hiroshima Lightning players
Iwate Big Bulls players
Kagoshima Rebnise players
Kanazawa Samuraiz players
San-en NeoPhoenix players
Sportspeople from Nassau, Bahamas
Tokyo Cinq Rêves players